Hell is a common setting found in art, literature, and popular culture (especially the horror and fantasy genres).

Art
 Perhaps the most famous depictions of Hell in art can be viewed in many paintings by medieval Dutch painter Hieronymus Bosch; The Garden of Earthly Delights is probably the most famous.
 Gustave Doré drew illustrations for Dante's The Divine Comedy, including Dante's visit to Hell.
 Auguste Rodin's sculpture, The Gates of Hell, is based on Hell depicted in Dante's The Divine Comedy.

Literature

 Dante Alighieri's famous epic poem Divine Comedy tells how he visits Heaven and Hell. His visit to Hell is probably the most famous literary depiction of the concept. Hell has its entrance in the Northern hemisphere, the other side of the world to Purgatory, and the bottom of Hell is at the Centre of the Earth. Hell is systematically divided in thematical tortures for crimes of the same nature in its Nine Circles, for example, people who were violent against others are trapped in the Seventh Circle of Hell in a boiling river of blood with centaurs firing arrows to keep them in their place. The people are judged by the serpentine Minos. Hell was created by Lucifer's fall; he is now trapped in the final level for Traitors. Hell is surrounded by the river Acheron, the neutral sit on the banks chased by swarms of insects and running after a banner. Dante claims to have seen several famous people being tortured in hell: biblical characters (Judas, Cain, ...), mythological characters (Medusa, the Minotaur,...), historical characters (Nero, Brutus, Attila the Hun,...) and people of his own lifetime. His journey is described with many imaginative details.
 In Milton's Paradise Lost, Lucifer and the other fallen angels (such as Beelzebub, Belial, and Molech) are imprisoned in Hell for rebelling against God after the birth of Christ. Hell is Nine days' fall from Heaven and three times farther than Earth. Between it and the Universe are Chaos and Night. In Hell, the fallen angels build Pandemonium. Hell's gate is guarded by Sin, Satan's daughter. In Book 10 a bridge is built from Hell to Earth by Sin and Death after the Fall of Man, which has been caused by Lucifer, while the fallen angels are turned into snakes.
 Christian theologian, scientist, philosopher and mystic Emanuel Swedenborg wrote Heaven and Hell in which he claimed to have visited Hell.
 In Piers Anthony's series Incarnations of Immortality, Hell, Heaven, and Purgatory are actual locations populated by the main characters and souls of the dead.
 Wayne Barlowe's book, God's Demon, is set in Hell and follows the endeavors of a powerful Demon, Sargatanas, to achieve redemption. The hell depicted is in many ways the classical Christian perception of burning cities and desolate wastelands with souls being routinely tortured.
 In the novel City Infernal by Edward Lee, as well as its sequels Infernal Angel and House Infernal, Hell is depicted as a modern metropolis (the Mephistopolis), albeit where electricity is provided by tapping the bio-electricity of tortured souls, chaos and suffering is systematically enforced, organic materials (bones, blood, et al.) are used for everything from food and building materials and everything in-between, and vicious horrors, both born and manufactured, run rampant, all of which serves as an affront to God. It's also said to exist in a version of Earth in a separate plane of existence, and that its dimensions are based on those of Heaven.
In Terry Pratchett's novel Eric (which is a parody of the Faust legend), Rincewind and Eric travel to hell, where they discover it has become steeped in bureaucracy, the Demon King Astfgl having decided that boredom might be the ultimate form of torture.
 C.S. Lewis's The Great Divorce (1945) borrows its title from William Blake's Marriage of Heaven and Hell (1793) and its inspiration from the Divine Comedy as the narrator is likewise guided through hell and heaven. 
 It's Hell again from C.S. Lewis's The Chronicles of Narnia (1950-1956), more specifically in the final chronicle The Last Battle (1956). The demonic god Tash, is strongly implied to represent the Hell of the Narnian world, as he is the antithesis to Aslan, the Jesus allegory, were Tash is an allegory for Satan. Therefore Tash's Country is likely the antithesis of Aslan's Country, the Heaven of the Narnian world. This is not to be confused with the nation Bism, from the chronicle The Silver Chair, which is a firey utopia at the bottom of the Narnian world inhabited by Gnomes and Salamanders.

Film

Feature and short films
 Hell appears in Häxan (1922).
 Mortimer Judd goes there in Dante's Inferno.
 Hell appears in Faust (1926).
 Little Joe goes there in Cabin in the Sky.
 Hell appears in the "Night on Bald Mountain" segment of  Fantasia (1940).
 The Three Stooges see a vision of themselves there in I'll Never Heil Again (1941).
 Hell appears in the 1942 short film The Devil with Hitler.
 Henry Van Cleve goes there in Heaven Can Wait.
 Eddie Kagle goes there in Angel on My Shoulder.
 Hell appears in Damn Yankees. 
 Hell appears in Santa Claus (1959).
 Hell appears in The Devil's Messenger (1963).
 Ebenezer Scrooge goes there in Scrooge (1970).
 Hell appears in Tales from the Crypt (1972).
 Hell appears in Pasolini's film The Canterbury Tales. A corrupt parishioner is taken to Hell where he is shown the Devil violently defecating hundreds of other corrupt clergymen out of his anus. The scenes were shot at Mt. Etna in Sicily.
In the 1973 Adult Film The Devil in Miss Jones, The main character Justine Jones (who just killed herself by slitting her wrists) begs Mr. Abaca to let her "earn" her place in Hell by being allowed to return to Earth and become the embodiment of Lust. At the end of the film Justine Jones somehow finds herself trapped in her own private Hell.
 Hell is subjective in the Hellraiser film series, as well as Clive Barker's novella. Upon solving the Lament Configuration, the sinner, or victim experiences a hell which they themselves defined by their own actions.
 Hell appears in The Devil and Max Devlin (1981).
 In Bill & Ted's Bogus Journey (1991), the title characters go to Hell.
 Hell is used as a plot subject in Jason Goes to Hell: The Final Friday (1993).
 In Event Horizon (1997), the ship's gravity drive opened a gateway to a hellish dimension outside the known universe.
 In Deconstructing Harry (1997) by Woody Allen, the protagonist descends into Hell where he has a chance to learn from the Devil himself (played by Billy Crystal), among other things, about the significance of having air conditioning in Hell, and then proceeds to discover his own father.
 What Dreams May Come, a 1998 film that won an Academy Award for its depiction of heaven and hell as the subjective creations of the individual, was an essentially mystical interpretation of heaven, hell and reincarnation. Aided by his personal angel (Cuba Gooding, Jr.), an accidentally killed man (Robin Williams) leaves his personal Heaven home and searches the depths of many and varied Hells to find and rescue his wife, who is in her own damnation because the loss of her family drove her to suicide. It was based on the eponymous novel by Richard Matheson.
 Little Nicky (2000) depicts Hell as a kingdom where monsters, giant fire birds, flying jellyfish and a large castle named the Castle of The Underworld belong. Satan (Harvey Keitel) performs tasks such as shoving a pineapple up Hitler's posterior.
 In Freddy vs Jason, Freddy Krueger is rendered powerless in Hell with Springwood forgetting him. Impersonating Jason Voorhees's mother, Freddy resurrects Jason from Hell and sends him to Springwood to cause panic and fear. 
 Constantine (2005) depicts as graphic a version of the traditional Christian version of Hell as can be found in cinema: it shows a parallel plane with many of the same buildings and structures as the normal world, but twisted, ruined and perpetually seared as if eternally hit by the blast wave of a nuclear bomb. This film is based on the DC/Vertigo comic series Hellblazer.
 Inuyasha the Movie: Swords of an Honorable Ruler (2005) depicts Hell near the end of film. Hell is summoned and opened by the Great Dog Demon's third sword, Sō'unga the sword of the underworld, which means that Hell is also the Sengoku period.
 Silent Hill (2006) depicts Hell numerous times throughout the film. Hell is depicted as a modern world, but decayed and rusted, populated by strange and horrific creatures.
 Drag Me to Hell tells the story of a woman cursed by an evil gypsy. The curse will send her to Hell unless she can get rid of it.
 Inferno (2016), based on the novel by Dan Brown and directed by Ron Howard, depicts Dante's Hell in popular culture.
 The House That Jack Built (2018) The main character, Jack (a serial killer) was lead into Hell by Verge, the philosopher who interviewed Jack throughout the duration of the film. Jack had the choice between staying in Hell or attempting to climb along a wall that led to Hell’s exit. Jack attempts the climb, and, ultimately, fails, causing him to fall even deeper into Hell.

Animated short films
 The Walt Disney Studios  depicted Hell in the Silly Symphony short "Hell's Bells" (1929).
 Adolf Wolf was blasted to Hell at the conclusion of MGM's Blitz Wolf (1942).
 After being crushed by a piano and denied entrance into Heaven, Tom is shown Hell and his eternal punishment there unless he can get Jerry's signed forgiveness in the Hanna-Barbera/MGM Tom and Jerry cartoon "Heavenly Puss" (1949).
 Warner Brother's Looney Tunes and Merrie Melodies cartoon shorts depicted Hell in Satan's Waitin' (1954) starring Sylvester the Cat and Tweety and Devil's Feud Cake (1964) with Yosemite Sam and Bugs Bunny.

Live action film
 After Master Gracey's butler Ramsley has been betrayed since he tried to protect him and since Ramsley killed Gracey's fiancée Elizabeth Henshaw, Ramsley said, "Well, damn you. Damn you all to HELL!" in The Haunted Mansion. He summons the evil spirits that leads to the gateway of the underworld from the fireplace where the fiery dragon is as he senses Ramsley's punishment he grabbed him and dragged to the underworld.

Television

Live action series
 In the Buffyverse, there are several places in the world that are natural gateways between the underworld and the world of mortals. One of these "Hellmouths" is located directly under the library of the Sunnydale High School. However, instead of there being one hell, there are hundreds of hell dimensions, in which demons are the dominant lifeform and non-demonic life is subject to great torture. Precise details of Hell are unrevealed, but Angel was sent to a Hell dimension for around four months on Earth and is said to have experienced five hundred years of torment in that time, leaving him temporarily regressed to a feral mentality before he begins to recover. When Buffy returns from death in Season 6, her friends believe her shocked and unengaging behavior is due to her being in a Hell dimension.
 In Doctor Who, the Tenth Doctor comes across a being which identifies itself as 'the Beast', resembles popular interpretations of the Devil, and makes numerous references to Hell. In a later episode, "Hell" is said to be a synonym for The Void between dimensions, the coordinates of which are all sixes. The Void is nothingness, the place between Universes.
 In the science fiction series Lexx, Heaven and Hell are depicted as two joined planets situated in the darkest part of the Dark Zone. The hell planet is known as Planet Fire to its inhabitants. When a human who has made bad choices dies in the Lexx universe, their life essence is taken to the Core of Fire. They are eternally reincarnated to suffer on the planet's surface. Hell is depicted as an endless burning desert, with distant towers dedicated to various types of punishment. The inhabitants have no memories of their resurrections or past lives, and exist in an ongoing cycle of suffering and death.
 The television series Supernatural mentions Hell many times as the place that demons originated- demons in this world being human souls broken by their torture in Hell- and shows the place in a couple of episodes. Dean Winchester was sent to Hell after a demon deal where he experienced forty years of torture in four months, and his brother Sam was trapped in a deeper part of Hell under the personal attention of Lucifer for over a year on Earth before his soul was rescued by Death; their father-figure, Bobby Singer, experienced his own Hell where he was tormented by demonic versions of Sam and Dean until he was rescued by the real Sam.
 The television series Reaper has the main character Sam as a bounty hunter for the devil who must send escaped souls back to hell. Entrances to hell are places that are considered hell on Earth, such as the Department of Motor Vehicles and a storage center where multiple murder victims are hidden.
 Hell appears in some episodes of The Twilight Zone, most notability in "A Nice Place to Visit" and "The Hunt".
 In the American television supernatural drama Ghost Whisperer, "Hell" is depicted as the place where ghosts go if they do not cross over into the light and instead go to the Dark Side.
 In the British science fiction sitcom Red Dwarf several characters make reference to "Silicon Hell", the presumed alternative to the concept of "Silicon Heaven" programmed into most artificially intelligent devices in order to preserve their loyalty to humanity.
 Hell appears in the superhero television series Legends of Tomorrow, portrayed as a slum. It is ruled by a triumvirate made up of Belial, Beelzebub and Satan.
 Hell also appears in Good Omens.
 Hell appears in Part 3 of Chilling Adventures of Sabrina
 The Bad Place is one of the main afterlife realms in The Good Place. Based of off the concept of hell, it is inhabited by demons whose job is to eternally torture humans who failed to get enough 'good person' points on Earth to enter the Good Place.
 Hell appears in the TV series Lucifer based on the Vertigo comic series. In this version, Hell is not seen as a fiery pit of damnation, but instead is an everlasting plane of cloud and ash where each damned soul is subject to an individual torment of their own making, which Lucifer refers to as a "Hell loop".

Animated series
 In the television series Futurama, the characters go to Robot Hell on occasion, where the Robot Devil and other evil robots reside. The entrance is located in New Jersey. Robot Heaven is also confirmed to exist.
 Hell appears in many episodes of the television series South Park, especially in "Do the Handicapped Go to Hell?" and "Probably". It's played for laughs as only Mormons go to Heaven and everyone else is punished for not getting the right religion, regardless of their actions when they were alive.
 The musical black comedy web series Hazbin Hotel is set in Hell. Hell is nominally ruled by Lucifer although residents seem to live in a de facto anarchist system, with no authority, allowing powerful demons and gangs to exert their own influence. The spin-off series, Helluva Boss is also set in Hell, which follows the employees of I.M.P. (Immediate Murder Professionals), an imp-run assassination company in Hell, on their many different jobs.
 The Netflix series Castlevania, shows depictions of hell.  After Dracula is killed he is later seen in hell with his wife.
 In the show Dragon Ball Z the characters go to hell several times.  When first translated to English, "Hell" was changed to "HFIL" to not offend American audiences, and the majority of the episodes that take place in Hell were not aired in America.
 In The Great Jahy Will Not Be Defeated!, Jahy, a former aide to the Demon King, tries aims to find parts of the mana crystal and restore her home world, the Dark Realm.
 The Simpsons depicts Hell occasionally.  On "Homer vs. Lisa and the 8th Commandment", Lisa imagines her family getting sent to Hell for her dad's illegal cable hookup. In the "Treehouse of Horror IV" segment "The Devil and Homer Simpson", the Devil (who looks exactly like Ned Flanders) sends Homer to Hell for a day while awaiting trial to determine ownership of his soul. In the "Treehouse of Horror XI" segment "G-g-ghost D-d-dad", Homer's spirit fails to perform a good deed required for entry to Heaven and gets sent to Hell, where Satan promises him an eternity of torture.
In Disenchantment, Luci is a demon from hell, and leads Bean to hell in the episode "Stairway to Hell" so they can retrieve their friend Elfo's soul (he had been sent to heaven, but Luci told him to go to hell, since he and Bean could not enter heaven).
In episode 12 of Inuyasha, as the spirit of Mayu Ikeda was trying to kill her brother Satoru at the hospital, the yōkai called Soul Piper's eyes are starting to open, it causes to pull her same place (which is her burned apartment) that will straight to hell.
In episode 9 of Inuyasha: The Final Act, Sesshōmaru has entered the underworld to save Kohaku and Rin, and since he survived because of the shard of the Shikon Jewel, and for Rin she does not have which means she dies the second time. Even where the Guardian of the Underworld is.

Radio
 Bleak Expectations BBC Radio 4 series spoofs Dante's Inferno in the 2nd episode of the fourth series. The underworld is a place for all souls before they are assigned to their respective heavens or hells.
 The BBC Radio 4 comedy series Old Harry's Game,  written by Andy Hamilton (who also stars as Satan), is set in Hell. This version of Hell is described by Satan as "a worst-thing-that-can-possibly-happen-to-you theme park", but because of the constant massive intake of damned souls is perpetually overcrowded, In Episode 1 of Series 4, God refuses Satan's plea to expand Hell in order to accommodate the overcrowding and even makes it half a size smaller.

Print cartoons and comics
 In the DC Universe, the character Lobo was banned from Hell, as he caused too many problems there, thus achieving immortality, as he was also banned from Heaven for much the same reason. Hell in the Sandman Series is run by a triumvirate of Lucifer Morningstar, Azazel, and Beelzebub. However demons like Belial and the Rhymer Etrigan scheme to get into the triumvirate. When the Fire of Hell is extinguished, an act of evil is required to reignite it. This is done by Eclipso slitting Enchantresse's throat. Hell is divided into Nine provinces. The Nine Provinces included Pandemonia, The Odium, The Gull, Praetori, Internecia, Ament, Labyrinth, Err, and Purgatory. Everything there is made from the damned. The rulers of Purgatory, Blaze and Satanus, lead a rebellion by offering hope to the hopeless, and finally Blaze betrays her brother and becomes Hell's ruler.
In The Sandman, Dream visits Lucifer, the ruler of Hell, who resigns and orders it emptied, giving the keys to Hell to Dream. Dream later decides to give the keys to angels from Heaven, who essentially return Hell to the same way it was before, only under their control. The aftermath of this is explored in greater depth in the spinoff series Lucifer.
 In the comic strip Dilbert (created by Scott Adams) "heck" is a lesser version of hell reserved for people who have done misdeeds that are not evil enough to warrant hell. Heck is ruled by Phil, the Prince of Insufficient Light who carries a giant spoon instead of a pitchfork.
 In the one-panel comic The Far Side (created by Gary Larson in the 1980s) Hell is featured among other recurring themes, depicting Satan and his minions as grim-looking figures in robes with horns and pitchforks, running the place in a business-like manner: in one instance, the bespectacled secretary behind the typewriter asks her boss seen as a silhouette behind the office door: There is an insurance salesman here. Should I admit him in or tell to go to Heaven?
 In the comic book series Ghost Rider, Johnny Blaze sold his soul to the demon Mephisto to cure his adoptive father from dying of cancer. In the recent revival of the series the Ghost Rider is seen residing in Hell to pay up his end of the bargain. Hell is depicted as a red desert with cannons and pools of lava. We see the devil as a powerful political leader residing in a grand palace with many servants and advisors.
 In the comic book series Hellboy by award-winning artist Mike Mignola, Hell is a dark, alternate dimension filled with flames and demons and where the infernal capital city of Pandemonium resides. In issue one "Seed of Destruction" the Nazis with aid of the mad monk Rasputin successfully breach the boundary of Hell via magic and call forth the infant Hellboy so that he may bring about the end of the world. They are stopped, however, by the Allied Forces, who rescue Hellboy and raise him.
 The comic book Spawn sees Hell and its demons as an important plot element. Mercenary Al Simmons gets betrayed by his own employers, dies, and goes to Hell. He then makes a deal with the devil Malebolgia (Guardian of Hell) that if he agrees to fight with Malebolgia's army, he would get to return to Earth and see his wife again.
 In the manga and anime series Yu-Gi-Oh!, there is a place where those who lose in so called "Shadow Duels" are forced to lose their souls and be banished to a realm of eternal night and torment, a realm simply called the "Shadow Realm". This is a pejorative replacement for the actual name of Hell, as English dubbers deemed it would be too inappropriate for the target audience they were aiming for.
The manga series Love in Hell focuses on a human in hell and the devil assigned to torture him.

Music

Albums
 GWAR uses the word "hell" and related concepts in the albums titled Beyond Hell (2006) and Hell-O! (1988).
 Slayer's second studio album is titled Hell Awaits. Many of the band's other songs also have Hellish lyrical themes.
 The 2004 Insane Clown Posse album, Hell's Pit is a concept album about Hell.
 Bring Me the Horizon's third studio album, There Is a Hell Believe Me I've Seen It. There Is a Heaven Let's Keep It a Secret revolves around the themes of Heaven and Hell.
 The Venom album titled Welcome to Hell was released in 1981.
 Gary Numan released the album Exile in 1997, which has very strong anti-Christian views on God and the acts which God seems to 'permit' to happen on earth. Also contains lyrics claiming Numan's personal dismissal of co-operating with God i.e. from the song 'The Angel Wars' - "I won't pray here or bow my head. I won't praise your name, I won't kneel down..." His newer albums, Pure (2000) and Jagged (2006) also put across songs with similar 'bases' but are not directly aimed at religion (specifically Christianity) and do not contain lyrics of personal 'conversations' with God or a similar nature.
 Dark Ambient project BlackWeald released an 11 hours-long concept album about hell, titled 666 Minutes in Hell in 2021

Gaming

Roleplaying games
 In the Dungeons & Dragons role-playing game, there are seven hellish planes, usually called the Lower Planes. The Plane most often referred to as 'Hell' is the Outer Plane Baator and comprises nine levels, sometimes called the Nine Hells or the Nine Hells of Baator. The other planes are Pandemonium, an endless underground network filled with howling winds that cause madness; the Abyss, a collection of countless places of evil and chaos, each one worse than the one before; Carceri, the prison of the multiverse; Hades, place of grey and bleak plains; the four peaks of the vulcans of Gehenna; and Archeron, a place of broken weapons and engines of war from all battlefields.
 In In Nomine, the forces of Heaven and Hell fight each other in a modern setting. Hell, the home location of all demons, is separated into several subdivisions called principalities, each ruled by one or more Demon Princes. All of Hell's principalities is named after a cultural version of hell (i.e., Hades, Sheol, Tartaurus, etc.) An additional area, known as lower hell, is where Lucifer resides.

Video games
 In Mortal Kombat, a version of Hell known as the Netherrealm exists, and is described as "the fiery depths of which are inhospitable to all but the most vile, a realm of demons and shadowy warriors"
 In Disgaea, Netherworld takes place.
 In Agony a Kickstarter-funded game, the player must survive in Hell.
 The 1996 city-building god game Afterlife has the player build Heaven and Hell as cities.
 In Bayonetta, Hell takes the form of a demonic realm called Inferno, a world inhabited by demons.
 The fantasy horror video game Dante's Inferno, based on Dante's depiction of Hell in the Divine Comedy, is exclusively set in Hell, fully realized in its medieval Roman Catholic conception as a physical and supernatural environment full of grotesque suffering and torture in correspondence with various sins.
 The video game series Devil May Cry features Hell as a location to battle through. The name of the main character Dante is a reference to The Divine Comedy, as is his twin brother Vergil.
 In the first of the Diablo series of games, a portion of hell is featured as a pit deep under the ground largely characterized as a place of suffering, as the bodies of hundreds of apparently tortured people reside there. The game manual refers to this place as actually part of the mortal realm whose barriers with the metaphysical Hell have weakened, causing it to take on hellish attributes combined with more worldly ones.
 In the second game of the above series, Diablo II, the player character ventures into Hell in Act IV to finish off the game by killing the title antagonist again, in his own separate domain of the realm, the Chaos Sanctuary.
 The famous Doom series also involves the concept of Hell, but with a science-fiction twist, as a future teleportation experiment accidentally opens a gate to Hell, releasing demons. Hell is treated in the Christian conception, replete with Satanic symbols and corporeal demons, as a parallel universe of crimson skies, black mountains and oceans of fire. At the end of the second game in the series Hell is wrecked, and the main character wonders where evil people will go when they die. In Doom 3 the player must travel to Hell to obtain a powerful Martian artifact.
 The first Fear Effect game deals extensively with the Chinese concept of hell, replete with its aforementioned political ramifications. Several of the later levels actually take place in the Chinese hell.
 In Hellgate: London, demonic armies have emerged from hell to reduce London to ruin and are slowly converting the world through a process called "Hellforming". The protagonist must fight back the demonic invaders.
 Hell is portrayed as a battlefield frozen in time in the video game Painkiller. Everything from bullets to trenches to mushroom clouds are present in stark stasis, allowing the player to move about the vista to get a good look. The level culminates with a showdown with Satan himself.
 In the game Tony Hawk's Underground 2, there is an unlockable level (within 2 others) that depicts Hell. Little Demons, rural citizens, and a jazz dancing Satan are in the level.
 In Minecraft, players are able to create a portal to "The Nether", which is inspired by the classic "fire-and-brimstone" depiction of Hell.
 In the Heroes of Might and Magic series, Sheogh, the equivalent of Hell, is the home of the Inferno faction, a dark kingdom of demons.
 In the game Dwarf Fortress, Hell is blocked off from the overworld by semi-molted rock and the mythical Adamantine.  Opening a pathway between the two unleashes a virtually endless amount of demons, effectively ending the game.
 In Super Meat Boy, Hell is the fourth chapter of the game. It is depicted as a dark reddish environment with much lava.
 In Saints Row: Gat out of Hell, The whole game takes place in a city set in hell.
 Skullgirls has a stage called Gehenna, which is made entirely of flesh, teeth, eyes, and a lake of blood. It is said to be the domain of the shapeshifter Double.
 Touhou has several appearances of Hell, mainly seen in Touhou Wily Beast and Weakest Creature.
 In another popular fighting game series, Guilty Gear, the characters Testament and Eddie both have a stage based on Hell. Hell was Testament's stage in Guilty Gear X, while in Guilty Gear XX, it was Eddie's stage. Up until Guilty Gear XX Accent Core, it was despicted as the freezing kind of Hell in GGXX, but in GGXXAC, it is dispicted as a more fiery hell with buildings halfway sunken in what appears to be a whole ocean of blood. The GGXXAC Hell was also Venom's stage in that game. Guilty Gear Isuka also has two stages that reference to Hell; in any mode other than GG Boost mode, a stage owned by both Testament and Eddie is called Hell's Forest, which is also called Deep Forest in the American Release of GGI. The GG Boost mode stage that references to Hell is called Hell's Prison, and is the fourth and second-to-last stage of GG Boost mode.
In a cutscene of the Japanese and European versions of the 1999 rhythm game Um Jammer Lammy, after the titular character slips on a banana peel and experiences head trauma, she dies and is sent to Hell. The Hell in the game isn't that fiery, unlike many other depictions of it, and no one appears to be tortured. This is likely based on the Japanese notion that only gods get to go to Heaven, while everyone else goes to Hell. In the Americas, this cutscene was changed to have Lammy catch her belt on a door and get slingshotted to a deserted island via a sequence reminiscent of a VHS tape rewinding.
 In Call of Duty: Black Ops 4 and Call of Duty: Black Ops Cold War, the Zombies mode features a version of Hell named the Dark Aether. Unlike popular depictions of Hell, it is depicted as a cold, desolate wasteland, with any being who wanders in becomes corrupted by the sheer evilness of the dimension. Along with the undead, many other monstrous creatures wander the dimension, such as ethereal jellyfish like creatures and beings known as "Elder Gods".
 In Terraria, the Underworld is a biome resembling common depictions of Hell, inhabited by demons and consisting of islands of ash floating in a sea of lava. It is also home to several Hell-themed items, namely Hellstone ore, explosive Hellfire arrows, and the Hel-Fire yo-yo.

References